Red coat, Redcoat  or Redcoats may refer to:

Entertainment
 Red Coat (Pretty Little Liars), fictional character
 Red Coats (film), the English title for Giubbe rosse an Italian film
 Redcoats (band), a rock band in Melbourne, Australia
 Redcoats (play), a 2019 play about holiday camps
 Redcoats (TV series), a series on the lives of Butlins Redcoats
 The Redcoats, an American rock band
 Georgia Redcoat Marching Band, of the University of Georgia
 Redcoat, a 1993 novel by Bernard Cornwell

Military
 Redshirts (Italy), volunteer soldiers headed by Garibaldi during Risorgimento
 Red coat (military uniform), a uniform worn historically by most infantry and some cavalry regiments of the British Army
 Red Serge, a ceremonial tunic worn by members of the Royal Canadian Mounted Police

Other
 Redcoats (Butlins), members of the  staff at Butlins holiday camps in the UK
 Redcoat Air Cargo, a British cargo airline from 1976 to 1982
 Ohio Valley Redcoats, a minor league baseball team
 The common name for Utricularia menziesii, an Australian carnivorous plant

See also
 
 
 Redshirt (disambiguation)